The 2003–04 Vanderbilt Commodores men's basketball men's basketball team finished with a 23–10 record (SEC East: 8–8, 4th) and reached the Sweet 16 of the NCAA tournament. The Commodores were ranked No. 25 in the final ESPN/USA Today (Coaches) poll.

The team was led by head coach Kevin Stallings and played its home games at Memorial Gymnasium.

Roster

Schedule and results

|-
!colspan=9 style=| Regular season

|-
!colspan=9 style=| SEC tournament

|-
!colspan=9 style=| NCAA tournament

Rankings

References

Vanderbilt Commodores men's basketball seasons
Vanderbilt
Vanderbilt Commodores men's basketball
Vanderbilt Commodores men's basketball
Vanderbilt